Chhinga Veng Football Club is an Indian  professional football club based in Aizawl, Mizoram, that competes in the Mizoram Premier League. The club made its I-League 2nd Division debut in the 2018–19 season, and finished as runners-up.

History
Chhinga Veng FC was established in 1985. Chhinga Veng won the Independence Day tournament, the oldest football cup tournament in Mizoram in  2017. They followed it by winning MFA Super cup in the same year.

Chhinga Veng won the Mizoram Premier League, the first division of Mizoram football in 2017, by beating then national champion Aizawl F.C., to make it a treble. In the next season they started where they left off in the previous, by winning Independence Day tournament. and MFA Super cup 2018. Chhinga Veng finished runners–up in 2018–19 Mizoram Premier League by losing to I-League side Aizawl FC on penalties in the final.

Chhinga Veng entered the national league in 2019 by competing in 2018–19 I-League 2nd Division.

Rivalry
Chhinga Veng has a rivalry with local side Chanmari FC, which also competes in Mizoram Premier League. In the regional championships, the club also nurture the rivalry with I-League giants Aizawl FC.

Stadium

Rajiv Gandhi Stadium, located in Salem Veng, Aizawl, Mizoram, is used as the home ground of Chhinga Veng for the home matches of Mizoram Premier League.

2019 squad

Kit manufacturers and shirt sponsors

Current technical staff

Team records

National/International record

Key
DNQ = did not qualify
DNP = Did not play
TBD = To be decided
TBA = To be added

Season

Head coach's record
updated on 13 September 2019

Honours

Domestic

League
I-League 2nd Division
Runners-up (1): 2018–19
Mizoram Premier League
Winners (1): 2017–18
Runners-up (1): 2018–19

Cup
MFA Super Cup
Winners (2): 2017, 2018
Independence Day Cup
Winners (2): 2017, 2018

References

External links
Chhinga Veng FC on Facebook
Chhinga Veng FC at Soccerway.
Chhinga Veng FC at Global Sports Archive.

Association football clubs established in 1985
I-League 2nd Division clubs
1985 establishments in Mizoram
Football clubs in Mizoram
Chhinga Veng FC